The 2018–19 Guinée Championnat National, called Ligue 1 Pro, is the 53rd season (since independence) of the Guinée Championnat National, the top-tier football league in Guinea. The season started on 13 December 2018.

Teams
Ashanti GB
AS Kaloum
ASFAG
CI Kamsar
CO Coyah
Eléphant de Coléah
Fello Star
Gangan FC
Hafia FC
Horoya AC
Renaissance FC
Santoba FC
Satellite FC
Wakriya AC

League table

Stadiums

References

External links
Ligue 1 Pro on RSSSF.com

Guinée Championnat National
Championnat National
Guinea